is the second season of the Japanese animated television series Bakugan: Battle Planet. Like the first, Armored Alliance is directed by Kazuya Ichikawa for TMS Entertainment, Nelvana Enterprises and Spin Master Entertainment. It was formally announced on October 15, 2019 and consists of 104 eleven-minute episodes.

The season debuted in Canada on Teletoon on February 16, 2020 and was later rebroadcast on YTV starting March 6, 2020. Cartoon Network began airing the show in the United States on March 1, 2020, with episodes made available through its video-on-demand platforms prior to their linear broadcast. In Japan, Armored Alliance began streaming on Amazon Prime Video, YouTube and a number of other services beginning April 3, 2020.


Episode list

International Broadcast
Armored Alliance premiered in Australia on Cartoon Network on April 25, 2020, with a terrestrial broadcast on 9Go! beginning on July 27, 2020. In the United Kingdom, the season debuted on September 1, 2020 on POP.

Notes

References

Bakugan episode lists
2020 Canadian television seasons
2021 Canadian television seasons
2020 Japanese television seasons
2021 Japanese television seasons